The Lycée Franco-Libanais Verdun, commonly known as the Lycée Verdun, is a prestigious French lycée located in the upscale Rue Verdun in Beirut, Lebanon. It was founded in 1951 by the Agence pour l'enseignement français à l'étranger, a French governmental organization which operates French lycées around the world.

The school follows both the official French curriculum of study which prepares the students to take the French general baccalauréat, and the Lebanese curriculum which prepares students for the Lebanese baccalauréat.

1999 marked the first year in which Terminale (12th grade) students graduated from the school.

The ADAL association (Association Des Anciens Du Lycée Verdun) formed in 2003, reunites all the Alumni Lycée students in gatherings at school and external recreational events to keep links between students old and new.

External links 
 Lycée Verdun website (French)

French international schools in Lebanon
International schools in Beirut
Private schools in Lebanon
AEFE contracted schools
Educational institutions established in 1951
1951 establishments in Lebanon